China Television Company, Ltd. (CTV) (Formerly called Taiwan Daytime TV (TDT) in 1969-1975) is a television broadcasting company based in Taipei, Republic of China (Taiwan). It was established on September 3, 1968, by the then-ruling Nationalist Party (KMT). The party owned the majority stake of the network. Trial broadcast started on October 9, 1969, and the channel formally started broadcasting on October 31 the same year. CTV was the first television channel to broadcast full colour television service to the whole island.

History
China Telvision was established on September 3, 1968, and began broadcasting in 1969.

On August 9, 1999, the channel was publicly listed on Taiwan Stock Exchange, becoming the first publicly listed broadcasting company on the island.

In 2006, due to effects borne by the media reform law in Taiwan requiring all political parties to divest their control in radio and television companies, 90% of CTV shares were sold to the China Times media group, effectively giving the station leeway to some of its satellite TV concerns, notably the Chung T'ien Television (CTi), one of major cable television programmers in Taiwan. Some CTV shows are now seen on CTi's two channels on cable.

It is currently the largest television channels on the island. Its shows consistently rated 2nd in all major time slots, and is home to Taiwan's most watched early evening newscast, the CTV News Global Report.

Funding allegations
In November 2019, Wang Liqiang, a self-proclaimed spy from the People's Republic of China (PRC) who defected to Australia, among other allegations, claimed that CTV had received PRC funding in return for airing stories unfavorable of the ROC government on Taiwan. 

CTV's parent company, The Want Want China Times Group, denied these allegations. The factual accuracy of his claims has also been disputed by espionage experts and suggested that his claims were made out of opportunism.

Appearances

Test card
The testcard of CTV is PM5544.

Channels
 CTV Main Channel
 CTV News Channel
 CTV Classic (formerly known as CTV MyLife)
 CTV Bravo (formerly known as CTV HD, the high-definition version channel available in terrestrial television. Launched on July 21, 2012)

See also
 China Times
 Chung T'ien Television (CTi)
 List of Taiwanese television series

References

External links
 CTV Official Site
  

Television stations in Taiwan
Chinese-language television stations
Television channels and stations established in 1968
1968 establishments in Taiwan
Kuomintang